Atla River is a river in Rapla County, Estonia. The river is 34.2 km long and basin size is 130.5 km2. It runs into Keila River.

References

Rivers of Estonia
Rapla County